The Hanoverian Waterloo Medal was issued to all members of the Hanoverian army who fought in the battles of Quatre Bras and Waterloo 16–18 June 1815.

History
The Hanoverian Waterloo Medal, like the British Waterloo Medal, has a profile and laureate head of the Prince Regent to the right, with the legend "GEORG. PRINZ. REGENT, 1815", round it.

On the reverse are two branches of laurel and a breastplate, with two spears and two colours crossed on either side; underneath is the date, "WATERLOO JUN. XVIII.", and, above, in Roman letters, "HANNOVER SCHER TAPFERKEIT". Round the rim are the soldier's name, regiment, etc.

This medal was founded by George, the Prince Regent in December 1817, and was awarded to every soldier who was present in the Hanoverian army at the Battle of Waterloo.  It is suspended by a crimson ribbon with light blue borders, and the owner was permitted to wear this ribbon without the medal, contrary to the rule which prevailed in Britain.

Unlike also the custom in Britain at the time it was issued, the medal remained the property of the soldier, and if he left the military service, he was still allowed to wear it.  It could not, however, under any circumstances, be transferred from one soldier to another, but after the death of the first recipient of it, it was ordered that it should remain in his family as an heirloom.  The Hanoverian troops, excluding those of the King's German Legion, present on the 16, 17 and 18 June at Battle of Quatre Bras and Waterloo, under the command of General Charles Alten, amounted to almost 16,900 men, equivalent to 18% of Wellington's Allied Army.

Gallery

Recipients 
 James Frederick Lyon

See also
Five nations of Seventh Coalition struck medals for soldiers who took part in the campaign:
 British Waterloo Medal (British Army and King's German Legion)
 Brunswick Waterloo Medal
 Hanoverian Waterloo Medal
 Nassau Waterloo Medal
 Prussian Waterloo Medal

Notes

References
 
 

Medal, Hanoverian
Orders, decorations, and medals of Hanover
1817 establishments in the Kingdom of Hanover
German campaign medals